Itakhuli or Sukreswar Hill is a small hill on the south bank of the Brahmaputra at Guwahati. The past official residence of the Deputy Commissioner of Kamrup District of Assam was located on top of this hill. The D.C. bungalow was vacated for the Brahmaputra river side development.  Adjacent to it in the western side of the D.C.'s bungalow is the Sukreswar Temple. Itakhuli hill have always have been of strategic importance it was the seat of the viceroys and a garrison since the early days of Kamrup from Ahom, to Mughal and to the British. If one stands on the lawns on the back side of the D.C. Bungalow one can have a panoramic view of Brahmaputra River with the Karmanakha rocks and Uma Nanda Temple on the Peacock island in the middle, with hills of Nilachal or Kamakhya on the west and Agiathuri hills far off in the north west, Manikarneswar hill and Aswaklanta on the north bank of the river, the Kurua hills on the northeast.

See also
 Battle of Itakhuli

References

Guwahati
Hills of Assam